"Lost in Space" is a song by the Lighthouse Family, released as their third pop single for their second album Postcards from Heaven (1997). The song was produced by Mike Peden. It was released in May 1998 and reached the top 10 in the United Kingdom and the top 40 in Europe.

Track listing
 UK CD1
 "Lost in Space" (Main Mix) — 5:23
 "Lost in Space" (Itaal Shur's Full Mix) — 5:07
 "Lost in Space" (Tuff Jam's Classic Garage Main Mix) — 6:41
 "Lost in Space" (Lost Man Vocal Mix) — 7:41

 UK CD2
 "Lost in Space" (Main Mix) — 5:23
 "High" (Acoustic Live at the Royal Albert Hall) — 4:09
 "Raincloud" (Cuca's Radio Edit) — 3:49
 "High" (Boris Dlugosch Big Club Mix) — 6:10

 UK Cassette
 "Lost in Space" (Main Mix) — 5:23
 "Lost in Space" (Itaal Shur's Full Mix) — 5:07

 European CD
 "Lost in Space" (Main Mix) — 5:23
 "Raincloud" (Cuca's Radio Edit) — 3:49
 "Question of Faith" (Faithful Club Mix) — 7:50

Music video
The "Lost in Space" music video was directed by Andrew Douglas and edited by Tim Thornton-Allan at Marshall Street Editors. It opens with the band in Rio de Janeiro, with prominent images of the Christ the Redeemer statue; at the end, they return to England, where a long panning shot of the then-recently completed Angel of the North sculpture (which is also seen on the single cover) closes the video.

Charts

Certifications

Chart performance
After the release of "Lost in Space" in the UK, it reached to #6 in the UK Single Chart in June 1998 and stayed in the charts for 8 weeks.

In Europe, "Lost in Space" wasn't as successful as "High" and only reached to #39 in the Eurochart Hot 100 in July 1998. At that same week, "High" was ten places higher than "Lost in Space" at #29.

References

External links
Chart Stats - UK chart performance of Lighthouse Family's "Lost in Space"
Eurochart Hot 100 which shows the peak position of Lighthouse Family's "Lost in Space"

1998 singles
Lighthouse Family songs
Songs written by Paul Tucker (musician)
1997 songs
Polydor Records singles
Pop ballads